Pyotr Yershov may refer to:
Pyotr Mikhaylovich Yershov (1910–1994), Russian theater director and art theoretician
Pyotr Pavlovich Yershov (1815–1869), Russian poet